Mimomyia (Mimomyia) luzonensis is a species of zoophilic mosquito belonging to the genus Mimomyia. It is found in Sri Lanka Bangladesh, Cambodia, China, Hong Kong, India, Indonesia, Japan, Malaysia, Myanmar, Nepal, Pakistan, Philippines, Singapore, Taiwan, Thailand, and Vietnam.

References

External links
Mimomyia Theobald, 1903 - Mosquito Taxonomic Inventory
Pupa of ficalbia (mimomyia) chamberlaini (Ludlow) (Diptera : Culicidae) 1974
A review of the mosquito species (Diptera: Culicidae) of Bangladesh.
Notes on the feeding and egg-laying habits of Ficalbia (Mimomyia) chamberlaini, Ludlow 1904. (Diptera, Culicidae.).
PHYSICO-CHEMICAL CHARACTERISTICS OF MOSQUITO BREEDING HABITATS IN AN IRRIGATION DEVELOPMENT AREA IN SRI LANKA

luzonensis